{{Infobox artist
| name = Berthe Morisot
| image = Morisot berthe photo.jpg
| caption = Berthe Morisot
| birth_name = Berthe Marie Pauline Morisot
| birth_date = 
| birth_place = Bourges, Cher, France
| death_date = 
| death_place = Paris, France
| resting_place = Cimetière de Passy
| nationality = French
| field = Painting
| training = 
| notable_works = {{bulleted|Summer's Day|The Cradle|View of Paris from the Trocadero|After Lunch}}
| movement = Impressionism
| works = 
| spouse = 
}}
Berthe Marie Pauline Morisot (January 14, 1841 – March 2, 1895) was a French painter and a member of the circle of painters in Paris who became known as the Impressionists. 

In 1864, Morisot exhibited for the first time in the highly esteemed Salon de Paris. Sponsored by the government and judged by Academicians, the Salon was the official, annual exhibition of the Académie des beaux-arts in Paris. Her work was selected for exhibition in six subsequent Salons until, in 1874, she joined the "rejected" Impressionists in the first of their own exhibitions, which included Paul Cézanne, Edgar Degas, Claude Monet, Camille Pissarro, Pierre-Auguste Renoir and Alfred Sisley. It was held at the studio of the photographer Nadar. Morisot went on to participate in all but one of the following eight impressionist exhibitions, between 1874 and 1886.

Morisot was married to Eugène Manet, the brother of her friend and colleague Édouard Manet.

She was described by art critic Gustave Geffroy in 1894 as one of "les trois grandes dames" (The three great ladies) of Impressionism alongside Marie Bracquemond and Mary Cassatt.

Early life 

Morisot was born January 14, 1841, in Bourges, France, into an affluent bourgeois family. Her father, Edmé Tiburce Morisot, was the prefect (senior administrator) of the department of Cher. He also studied architecture at École des Beaux Arts. Her mother, Marie-Joséphine-Cornélie Thomas, was the great-niece of Jean-Honoré Fragonard, one of the most prolific Rococo painters of the ancien régime. She had two older sisters, Yves (1838–1893) and Edma (1839–1921), plus a younger brother, Tiburce, born in 1848. The family moved to Paris in 1852, when Morisot was a child.

It was commonplace for daughters of bourgeois families to receive art education, so Berthe and her sisters Yves and Edma were taught privately by Geoffroy-Alphonse Chocarne and Joseph Guichard. Morisot and her sisters initially started taking lessons so that they could each make a drawing for their father for his birthday. In 1857 Guichard, who ran a school for girls in Rue des Moulins, introduced Berthe and Edma to the Louvre gallery where from 1858 they learned by copying paintings. The Morisots were not only forbidden to work at the museum unchaperoned, but they were also totally barred from formal training. Guichard also introduced them to the works of Gavarni.

As art students, Berthe and Edma worked closely together until 1869, when Edma married Adolphe Pontillon, a naval officer, moved to Cherbourg, and had less time to paint. Letters between the sisters show a loving relationship, underscored by Berthe's regret at the distance between them and Edma's withdrawal from painting. Edma wholeheartedly supported Berthe's continued work and their families always remained close. Edma wrote "… I am often with you in thought, dear Berthe. I’m in your studio and I like to slip away, if only for a quarter of an hour, to breathe that atmosphere that we shared for many years…".

Her sister Yves married Theodore Gobillard, a tax inspector, in 1866 and was painted by Edgar Degas as Mrs Theodore Gobillard (Metropolitan Museum of Art, New York City).

As a copyist at the Louvre, Morisot met and befriended other artists such as Manet and Monet. In 1861 she was introduced to Jean-Baptiste-Camille Corot, the pivotal landscape painter of the Barbizon school who also excelled in figure painting. Under Corot's influence, she took up the plein air (outdoors) method of working. By 1863 she was studying under , another Barbizon painter. In the winter of 1863–64 she studied sculpture under Aimé Millet, but none of her sculptures is known to survive.

 Main periods of Morisot's work 

 Training, 1857–1870 
It is hard to trace the stages of Morisot's training and to tell the exact influence of her teachers because she was never pleased with her work and she destroyed nearly all of the artworks she produced before 1869. Her first teacher, Geoffroy-Alphonse Chocarne, taught her the basics of drawing. After several months, Morisot began to take classes taught by Guichard. During this period, she drew mostly ancient classical figures. When Morisot expressed her interests in plein-air painting, Guichard sent her to follow Corot and Oudinot. Painting outdoors, she used watercolors which are easy to carry. At that time, Morisot also became interested in pastel.

 Watercolorist, 1870–1874 
During this period, Morisot still found oil painting difficult, and worked mostly in watercolor. Her choice of colors is rather restrained; however, the delicate repetition of hues renders a balanced effect. Due to specific characteristics of watercolors as a medium, Morisot was able to create a translucent atmosphere and feathery touch, which contribute to the freshness in her paintings.

 Impressionism, 1875–1885 
Having become more confident about oil painting, Morisot worked in oil, watercolor and pastel at the same time, as Degas did. She painted very quickly but did much sketching as preparation, so she could paint "a mouth, eyes, and a nose with a single brushstroke."  She made countless studies of her subjects, which were drawn from her life so she became quite familiar with them. When it became inconvenient to paint outdoors, the highly finished watercolors done in the preparatory stages allowed her to continue painting indoors later.

 Turning, 1885–1887 
After 1885, drawing began to dominate in Morisot's works. Morisot actively experimented with charcoals and color pencils. Her reviving interest in drawing was motivated by her Impressionist friends, who are known for blurring forms. Morisot put her emphasis on the clarification of the form and lines during this period. In addition, she was influenced by photography and Japonisme. She adopted the style of placing objects away from the center of the composition from Japanese prints of the time.

 Synthesis, 1887–1895 
Morisot started to use the technique of squaring and the medium of tracing paper to transcribe her drawing to the canvas exactly. By employing this new method, Morisot was able to create compositions with more complicated interaction between figures. She stressed the composition and the forms while her Impressionist brushstrokes still remained. Her original synthesis of the Impressionist touch with broad strokes and light reflections, and the graphic approach featured by clear lines, made her late works distinctive.

 Style and technique 
Because she was a female artist, Morisot's paintings were often labeled as being full of "feminine charm" by male critics, for their elegance and lightness. In 1890, Morisot wrote in a notebook about her struggles to be taken seriously as an artist: "I don't think there has ever been a man who treated a woman as an equal and that's all I would have asked for, for I know I'm worth as much as they." 
Her light brushstrokes often led to critics using the verb "effleurer" (to touch lightly, brush against) to describe her technique. In her early life, Morisot painted in the open air as other Impressionists to look for truths in observation. Around 1880 she began painting on unprimed canvases—a technique Manet and Eva Gonzalès also experimented with at the time—and her brushwork became looser. In 1888–89, her brushstrokes transitioned from short, rapid strokes to long, sinuous ones that define form. The outer edges of her paintings were often left unfinished, allowing the canvas to show through and increasing the sense of spontaneity. After 1885, she worked mostly from preliminary drawings before beginning her oil paintings. She often worked in oil paint, watercolors, and pastel simultaneously, and sketched using various drawing media. Morisot's works are almost always small in scale.

Morisot creates a sense of space and depth through the use of color. Although her color palette was somewhat limited, her fellow impressionists regarded her as a "virtuoso colorist". She typically made expansive use of white to create a sense of transparency, whether used as a pure white or mixed with other colors. In her large painting The Cherry Tree, the colors are more vivid but still emphasize the form.

Inspired by Manet's drawings, she kept the use of color to a minimum when constructing a motif. Responding to the experiments conducted by Manet and Edgar Degas, Morisot used barely tinted whites to harmonize the paintings. Like Degas, she played with three media simultaneously in one painting: watercolor, pastel, and oil paints. In the second half of her career, she learned from Renoir by mimicking his motifs. She also shared an interest in keeping a balance between the density of figures and the atmospheric traits of light with Renoir in her later works.

 Subjects 

Morisot painted what she experienced on a daily basis. Most of her paintings include domestic scenes of family, children, ladies, and flowers, depicting what women's life was like in the late nineteenth century. Instead of portraying the public space and  society, Morisot preferred private, intimate scenes. This reflects the cultural restrictions of her class and gender at that time. Like her fellow Impressionist Mary Cassatt, she focused on domestic life and portraits in which she could use family and personal friends as models, including her daughter Julie and sister Edma. The stenographic presentation of her daily life conveys a strong hope to stop the fleeting passage of time. By portraying flowers, she used metaphors to celebrate womanhood. Prior to the 1860s, Morisot painted subjects in line with the Barbizon school before turning to scenes of contemporary femininity. Paintings like The Cradle (1872), in which she depicted current trends for nursery furniture, reflect her sensitivity to fashion and advertising, both of which would have been apparent to her female audience. Her works also include landscapes, garden settings, boating scenes, and themes of boredom or ennui. Later in her career Morisot worked with more ambitious themes, such as nudes. In her late works, she often referred to the past to recall a memory from her earlier life and youth, and her departed companions.

 Impressionism 

Morisot's first appearance in the Salon de Paris came at the age of twenty-three in 1864, with the acceptance of two landscape paintings. She continued to show regularly in the Salon, to generally favorable reviews, until 1873, the year before the first Impressionist exhibition. She exhibited with the Impressionists from 1874 onwards, only missing the exhibition in 1878 when her daughter was born.

Impressionism's alleged attachment to brilliant color, sensual surface effects, and fleeting sensory perceptions led a number of critics to assert in retrospect that this style, once primarily the battlefield of insouciant, combative males, was inherently feminine and best suited to women's weaker temperaments, lesser intellectual capabilities, and greater sensibility.

During Morisot's 1874 exhibition with the Impressionists, such as Monet and Manet, Le Figaro critic Albert Wolff noted that the Impressionists consisted of "five or six lunatics of which one is a woman...[whose] feminine grace is maintained amid the outpourings of a delirious mind."

Morisot's mature career began in 1872. She found an audience for her work with Durand-Ruel, the private dealer, who bought twenty-two paintings. In 1877, she was described by the critic for Le Temps as the "one real Impressionist in this group." She chose to exhibit under her full maiden name instead of using a pseudonym or her married name. As her skill and style improved, many began to rethink their opinion toward Morisot. In the 1880 exhibition, many reviews judged Morisot among the best, even including Le Figaro critic Albert Wolff.

Personal life
Morisot came from an eminent family, the daughter of a government official and the great-niece of Rococo artist Jean-Honoré Fragonard. She met her longtime friend and colleague, Édouard Manet, in 1868. By the introduction of Manet, Morisot was married to Édouard's brother, Eugène Manet in 1874. On November 14, 1878, she gave birth to her only child, Julie, who posed frequently for her mother and other Impressionist artists, including Renoir and her uncle Édouard. 

Correspondence between Morisot and Édouard Manet shows warm affection, and Manet gave her an easel as a Christmas present. Morisot often posed for Manet and there are several portrait paintings of Morisot such as Repose (Portrait of Berthe Morisot) and Berthe Morisot with a Bouquet. Morisot died on March 2, 1895, in Paris, of pneumonia contracted while attending to her daughter Julie's similar illness, thus making Julie an orphan at the age of 16. She was interred in the Cimetière de Passy.

Works

Selection of worksThis list is incomplete, you can help by expanding it with certified entries.This limited selection is based in part on the book Berthe Morisot by Charles F. Stuckey, William P. Scott and Susan G. Lindsay, which is in turn drawn from the 1961 catalogue by Marie-Louise Bataille, Rouaart Denis and Georges Wildenstein. There are variations between the dates of execution, first showing and purchase. Titles may vary between sources.

1864–1874
 Étude, 1864, oil on canvas, 60.3 × 73 cm, private collection
 Chaumière en Normandie, 1865, oil on canvas, 46 × 55 cm, private collection
 La Seine en aval du pont d'Iéna, 1866, oil on canvas, 51 × 73 cm, private collection 
 La Rivière de Pont Aven à Roz-Bras, 1867, oil on canvas, 55 × 73 cm, private collection – Chicago
 Bateaux à l'aurore, 1869, pastel on paper, 19.7 × 26.7 cm, private collectionJeune fille à sa fenêtre, 1869, oil on canvas, 36.8 × 45.4 cm, private collection
 Madame Morisot et sa fille Madame Pontillon (La Lecture), 1869–1870, oil on canvas, 101 × 81.8 cm, National Gallery of Art, Washington, D.C.
 Le Port de Cherbourg, 1871, crayon and watercolour on paper, 15.6 × 20.3 cm, private collection of Paul Mellon, Upperville, Virginia
 Le Port de Cherbourg, 1871, oil on canvas, 41.9 × 55.9 cm, private collection of Paul Mellon, Upperville, Virginia
 Vue de paris de hauteurs du Trocadéro, 1871, oil on canvas, 46.1 × 81.5 cm, Santa Barbara Museum of Art, California
 Femme et enfant au balcon, 1871–72, watercolor, 20.6 × 17.3 cm, Art Institute of Chicago
 Intérieur, 1871, oil on canvas, 60 × 73 cm, private collection
 Portrait de Madame Pontillon, 1871, pastel on paper, 85.5 × 65.8 cm, Louvre – drawings cabinet gift of Madame Edma Pontillon to the Louvre in 1921, in the collection of the Musée d'Orsay
 L'Entrée du port, 1871, watercolour on paper, 24.9 × 15.1 cm, Bagnols-sur-Cèze – drawings cabinet
 Madame Pontillon et sa fille Jeanne sur un canapé, 1871, watercolour on paper, 25.1 × 25.9 cm, National Gallery of Art, Washington
 Jeune fille sur un banc (Edma Pontillon), 1872, oil on canvas, 33 × 41 cm 
 Cache-cache, 1872, oil on canvas, 33 × 41 cm, Private collection 
 Le Berceau, 1872, oil on canvas, 56 × 46 cm Musée d'Orsay, Paris
 La Lecture (Edma lisant), also titled L'Ombrelle verte, 1873, oil on canvas, 45.1 × 72.4 cm, Cleveland Museum of Art, Ohio
 Sur la plage des Petites-Dalles, 1873, oil on canvas, 24.1 × 50.2 cm, Virginia Museum of Fine Arts, Richmond, Virginia
 Madame Boursier et sa fille, 1873, oil on canvas, 74 × 52 cm, Virginia Museum of Fine Arts 
 Le Village de Maurecourt, 1873, pastel on paper, 47 × 71.8 cm, private collection 
 Coin de Paris vu de Passy, 1873, pastel on paper, 27 × 34.9 cm, private collection 
 Sur la terrasse, 1874, oil on canvas, 45 × 54 cm, Musée du Petit Palais, Paris
 Portrait de Madame Hubbard, 1874, oil on canvas, 50.5 × 81 cm, Ordrupgaard museum de Copenhagen 
 Femme et enfant au bord de la mer , 1874, watercolor on paper, 16 × 21.3 cm, private collection

 1875–1884 
 Percher de blanchisseuses , 1875, Oil on canvas 33 × 40.8 cm, National Gallery of Art, Washington D.C.
 Jeune fille au miroir, 1875, oil on canvas, 54 × 45 cm, private collection
 Scène de port dans l'île de Wight, 1875, oil on canvas, 48 × 36 cm private collection
 Scène de port dans l'île de Wight, 1875, oil on canvas, 43 × 64 cm, Newark Museum, Newark, New Jersey
 Eugène Manet à l'île de Wight, 1875, oil on canvas, 38 × 46 cm private collection
 Avant d'un yacht, 1875, watercolour on paper, 20.6 × 26.7 cm, Sterling and Francine Clark Art Institute, Williamstown, Massachusetts
 Femme à sa toilette, 1875, oil on canvas, 46 × 38 cm private collection
  Femme à sa toilette , 1875–1880, hst, dim; 60.3 × 80.4 cm, Coll. Art Institute of Chicago 
 Portrait de femme (Avant le théâtre), 1875, oil on canvas, 57 × 31 cm, Galerie Schröder & Leisewitz, Bremen
 Jeune femme au bal encore intitulé Jeune femme en toilette de bal, 1876, oil on canvas, 86 × 53 cm Musée d'Orsay
 Au Bal ou Jeune fille au bal, 1875, oil on canvas, 62 × 52 cm, Musée Marmottan-Monet, ParisJeune Femme arrosant un arbuste, 1876, oil on canvas, 40.01 × 31.75 cm, Virginia Museum of Fine Arts, Richmond, Virginia
 Le Corsage noir , 1876, oil on canvas, 73 × 59.8 cm National Gallery of Ireland, Dublin 
 Le Psyché, 1876, oil on canvas, 65 × 54 cm, Thyssen-Bornemisza Museum, Madrid 
 Rêveuse, 1877, pastel on canvas, 50.2 × 61 cm, Nelson-Atkins Museum of Art, Kansas City, Missouri
 L'Été, encore intitulé Jeune femme près d'une fenêtre 1878, oil on canvas, 76 × 61 cm, Musée Fabre, Montpellier
 Jeune feme assise, 1878–1879, oil on canvas, 80 × 100 cm, private collection New York City
 Jeune fille de dos à sa toilette, encore intitulé Femme à sa toilette 1879, oil on canvas, 60.3 × 80.4 cm Art Institute of Chicago
 Le Lac du Bois de Boulogne (Jour d'été), 1879, 45.7 × 75.3 cm, National Gallery, London
 Dans le jardin (Dames cueillant des fleurs), 1879, oil on canvas, 61 × 73.5 cm, Nationalmuseum Stockholm
 Jeune femme en toilette de bal (Young Woman in Evening Dress), 1879, oil on canvas, 71 x 54 cm, Musée d’Orsay, Paris
 Hiver, 1880, oil on canvas, 73.5 × 58.5 cm, Dallas Museum of Art
 Deux filles assises près d'une table, 1880, crayon and watercolour on paper 19,6 × 26.6 cm private collection Germany
 Bateaux sur la Seine. c. 1880, 25.5 × 50 cm. Provenance: acquired from the artist's family by the first owner, sold with a letter of authenticity from Daniel Wildenstein at Sotheby's, 1984.
 Plage à Nice 1881–1882, watercolour on paper 42 × 55 cm, Nationalmuseum Stockholm
 Le Port de Nice, 1881–1882, oil on canvas, 53 × 43 cm private collection
 Le Port de Nice, 1881–1882, oil on canvas, 41 × 55 cm private collection
 Le Port de Nice 1881 (?)third version format 38 × 46 cm conserved at Dallas Museum of Art
 Le Thé, 1882, oil on canvas, 57.5 × 71.5 cm, Fondation Madelon Vaduz, Liechtenstein
 Le Port de Nice, 1881–1882, oil on canvas, 53 × 43 cm private collection
 La Fable, 1883, oil on canvas, 65 × 81 cm private collection
 Le Jardin (Femmes dans le jardin) (1882–1883) oil on canvas, 99.1 × 127 cm, Sara Lee Corporation, Chicago
 Eugène Manet et sa fille au jardin 1883, oil on canvas, 60 × 73, private collection
 Dans le jardin à Maurecourt, 1883, oil on canvas, 54 × 65 cm, Toledo Museum of Art
 Le Quai de Bougival, 1883, oil on canvas, 55.5 × 46 cm, Nasjonalgalleriet, Oslo
 Julie et son bateau (Enfant jouant), 1883, watercolour on paper, 25 × 16 cm, private collection
 La Meule de foin 1883, oil on canvas, 55.3 × 45.7 cm, private collection, New York
 Dans la véranda, 1884, oil on canvas, 81 × 10 cm, private collection
 Julie avec sa poupée, 1884, oil on canvas, 82 × 10 cm, private collection
 Petite fille avec sa poupée (Julie Manet), 1884, pastel on paper, 60 × 46 cm, private collection
 Sur le lac, 1884, oil on canvas, 65 × 54 cm, private collection
 The Artist's Daughter, Julie, with her Nanny, c. 1884, oil on canvas, Minneapolis Institute of Art

 1885–1894 
 Autoportrait, 1885, pastel on paper, 47.5 × 37.5 cm, Art Institute of Chicago
 Autoportrait avec Julie, 1885, oil on canvas, 72 × 91 cm, private collection
 Jeune femme assise au Bois de Boulogne, 1885, watercolour on paper, 19 × 28 cm, Metropolitan Museum of Art, New York City
 La Forêt de Compiègne, 1885, oil on canvas, 54.2 × 64.8 cm, Art Institute of Chicago
 Le Bain (Jeune file se coiffant), 1885–1886, oil on canvas, 81.1 × 72.3 cm, Art Institute of Chicago
 Dans la salle à manger, 1885–1886, oil on canvas, 61.3 × 50 cm, National Gallery of Art
 Le Lever, 1886, oil on canvas, 65 × 54 cm, collection Durand-Ruel
 Intérieur à Jersey (Intérieur de cottage), 1886, oil on canvas, 50 × 60 cm, Musée communal des beaux-arts d'Ixelles
 Femme s'essuyant, 1886–1887, pastel on paper, 42 × 41 cm, Non localisé
 Julie avec un chat, 1887, drypoint, 14.5 × 11.3 cm, National Gallery of Art, Washington
 Nu de dos, 1887, charcoal on paper, 57 × 43 cm, private collection
 Éventail en médaillon, 1887, watercolour on silk fan, private collection
 Portrait de Paule Gobillard, 1887, coloured pencil on paper, 27.9 × 22.9 cm, Reader's Digest Association, New York
 Le Lac du Bois de Boulogne, 1887, watercolour on paper, 29.5 × 22.2 cm, National Museum of Women in the Arts, Washington
 Fillette lisant (La lecture), 1888, oil on canvas, 74.3 × 92.7 cm, Museum of Fine Arts (St. Petersburg, Florida)
 Berthe Morisot and Julie Manet, c.1888–1890, drypoint, 18.42 x 13.49 cm, Minneapolis Institute of Art, Minneapolis
 La Cueillette des oranges, 1889, pastel, 61 × 46 cm, Musée d'art et d'histoire de Provence, GrasseSous l'oranger (Julie), 1889, oil on canvas, 54 × 65 cm, private collectionL'Île du Bois de Boulogne, 1889, oil on canvas, 68.4 × 54.6 cm, National Gallery of Art, WashingtonLe Flageolet (Julie Manet et Jeanne Gobillard), 1891, oil on canvas, 56 × 87 cm, private collectionLe Cerisier 1891, 1891, oil on canvas, 138 × 88.9 cm, private collection, Washington Étude pour Le Cerisier, 1891, pastel on paper, 45.7 × 48.9 cm, The Reader's Digest Association Julie Manet avec son lévrier, 1893, oil on canvas, 73× 80 cm, Musée Marmottan-Monet, Paris Les Enfants de Gabriel Thomas, 1894, oil on canvas, 100 × 80 cm, Musée d'Orsay, ParisLa Coiffure, 1894, oil on canvas, 100 × 80 cm, Museo Nacional de Bellas Artes (Buenos Aires)Jeune fille aux cheveux noirs, 1894, pencil and watercolour, 23.1 × 16.8 cm, Philadelphia Museum of Art, Philadelphia

Gallery

Portraits of Morisot

Art market

Morisot's work sold comparatively well. She achieved the two highest prices at a Hôtel Drouot auction in 1875, the Interior (Young Woman with Mirror) sold for 480 francs, and her pastel On the Lawn sold for 320 francs. Her works averaged 250 francs, the best relative prices at the auction.

In February 2013, Morisot became the highest priced female artist, when After Lunch (1881), a portrait of a young redhead in a straw hat and purple dress, sold for $10.9 million at a Christie's auction. The painting achieved roughly three times its upper estimate,Ellen Gamerman and Mary M. Lane (April 18, 2013), Women on the Verge The Wall Street Journal. and it exceeded the 2012 record of $10.7 million for a sculpture by Louise Bourgeois.

Legacy
She was portrayed by actress Marine Delterme in a 2012 French biographical TV film directed by Caroline Champetier. The character of Beatrice de Clerval in Elizabeth Kostova's The Swan Thieves is largely based on Morisot.

She was featured as the "A First Impressionist" in an article written by Anne Truitt in the New York Times on June 3, 1990.

From Melissa Burdick Harmon, an editor at Biography magazine, "While some of Morisot's work may seem to us today like sweet depictions of babies in cradles, at the time these images were considered extremely intimate, as objects related to infants belonged exclusively to the world of women."

In 2019, the Musée d'Orsay devoted a temporary exhibition to Berthe Morisot to pay tribute to her work.

 Exhibition 

 See also 
 Women artists
 Western painting
 History of painting
 Julie Manet

Notes

References

Sources

 
 Denvir, B. (2000). The Chronicle of Impressionism: An Intimate Diary of the Lives and World of the Great Artists. London: Thames & Hudson. 
 Higonnet, Anne (1995). Berthe Morisot. Berkeley: University of California Press. 
 Turner, J. (2000). From Monet to Cézanne: late 19th-century French artists. Grove Art. New York: St Martin's Press. 
 Manet, Julie, Rosalind de Boland Roberts, and Jane Roberts. Growing Up with the Impressionists: The Diary of Julie Manet. London: Sotheby's Publications, 1987
 Shennan, Margaret (1996). Berthe Morisot: The First Lady of Impressionism''. Stroud: Sutton Publishing.

External links 

 
 
 
 Edma Morisot, 1865, Berthe Morisot painting at her easel Private collection.
 Berthe Morisot at the WebMuseum
 Biography of Berthe Morisot
 
 

1841 births
1895 deaths
Artists from Bourges
19th-century French painters
French women painters
French Impressionist painters
Burials at Passy Cemetery
19th-century French women artists